Sarettii is a Swedish rapper. Also known as Sarettii (𝟧𝟣𝟦𝟪), he creates his music in and lives in Hisings Backa. His biggest commercial success has been the single "Som Dom" reaching number 1 on Sverigetopplistan, the official Swedish Singles Chart.

Discography

Singles

References

External links
Official website

Living people
Swedish rappers
Year of birth missing (living people)